L class submarine may refer to:

British L-class submarine
United States L-class submarine
Leninets-class submarine, of the Soviet Navy
Japanese Type L submarine